Gia Kharaishvili (born 13 February 1999 in Khashuri, Georgia) is a rugby union player who currently plays for RC Armazi in the Didi 10 and also plays internationally for Georgia U20 as a prop.

References

1999 births
Living people
Rugby union players from Georgia (country)
Rugby union props
Rugby union players from Tbilisi